Eworthy is a hamlet in Devon, England. It is situated close to Germansweek. There is a Methodist chapel in the hamlet.

References

Hamlets in Devon